Isingiro Hospital is a 1992 Dutch documentary film, made by directors Hillie Molenaar and Joop van Wijk about the patients of the Isingiro Hospital, located in the rural area of North West Tanzania. The documentary shows patients and doctors who are fighting a battle against HIV, malaria and meningitis.

Awards
 Golden Calf for Best Short Documentary at the Netherlands Film Festival (1993)

References

External links
 Isingiro Hospital documentary online

Documentary films about health care
Dutch documentary films
Films set in Tanzania
Hospitals in Tanzania
1992 films
1992 documentary films